Voidwards is the third full-length album from Finnish metal band Dolorian, released in 2006.

Track listing
"Dual – Void – Trident" - 05:10
"In The Locus Of Bone" - 06:26
"Co-il-lusion" - 01:24
"Ivory Artery" - 08:53
"The Flow Of Seething Visions" - 09:40
"The One Whose Name Has No End" - 10:31
"The Absolute Halo Is Awakening" - 03:38
"Epoch Of Cyclosure" - 08:40
"The Fire Which Burns Not" - 01:03
"Raja Naga – Rising" - 10:26

2006 albums
Dolorian albums